Brian Clifford (born 20 August 1956) is an Irish former swimmer. He competed in the men's 1500 metre freestyle at the 1972 Summer Olympics.

References

External links
 

1956 births
Living people
Irish male freestyle swimmers
Olympic swimmers of Ireland
Swimmers at the 1972 Summer Olympics
Place of birth missing (living people)
20th-century Irish people
21st-century Irish people